National Auditorium is an entertainment center at Paseo de la Reforma #50, Chapultepec in Mexico City.

The National Auditorium is considered among the world's best venues by specialized media. It was designed by Mexican architects Pedro Ramírez Vázquez and Gonzalo Ramírez del Sordo, and remodeled by Abraham Zabludovsky and Teodoro González de León. Concerts, art, theatre, dance, and more are hosted at the venue.

It also has a small venue available for smaller events, called Auditorio Lunario. The total seating capacity of 10,000.

History

Constructed in 1952, it was used for volleyball and basketball matches of the 1954 Central American and Caribbean Games and had seen performances of the San Francisco Ballet and New York Philharmonic in 1958. The auditorium was the venue for the gymnastics events at the 1968 Summer Olympics.

Since the 1970s, it has been used primarily for international music, song, dance and film festivals, fairs and exhibitions.

From 1988 to 1990, the auditorium went through an 18-months-long renovation, designed by architects Abraham Zaludovsky and Teodoro Gonzalez de Leon, which brought it to the current design.

It hosted the 1993 and 2007 Miss Universe pageants.

In August 12, 1998, Barney, Baby Bop, BJ  and their friends: Professor Tinkerputt & Mother Goose performed here during the Mexican tour for Barney's Big Surprise.

In 2007, the American magazine Pollstar made the National Auditorium a nominee for International Theatre of the Year.

In November 2007, the Auditorio Nacional won the Billboard Touring Award for best concert venue under 10,000 seats.

Auditorio Nacional houses the largest pipe organ in Latin America.

In 2016, it hosted the premiere of the largely anticipated comic-book film, Batman v Superman: Dawn of Justice.

References

1968 Summer Olympics official report. Volume 2. Part 1. p. 77.

External links 
 

Event venues established in 1952
Sports venues in Mexico City
Buildings and structures in Mexico City
Venues of the 1968 Summer Olympics
Olympic gymnastics venues
Convention centers in Mexico
Chapultepec
Concert halls in Mexico
Theatres in Mexico City
Paseo de la Reforma